A list of Bangladeshi films released in 1980.

Releases

See also

1980 in Bangladesh

References

Film
Bangladesh
 1980